Doomstown is a Canadian television movie, which aired in 2006 on CTV. Set in the Mount Olive-Silverstone-Jamestown neighbourhood Toronto, Ontario, the film explores the issue of gang violence in the neighbourhood of Rexdale.

Doomstown was written and directed by Sudz Sutherland. Its cast includes K. C. Collins who played Kevin 'Jedi' Barrows, Mark Taylor who played Mike "Twist" Twistleton, Genelle Williams who played Monica, Clé Bennett played Money, Shakura S'Aida, Yanna McIntosh played Pat Barrows, Shawn Singleton, Zainab Musa and Kristin Fairlie who played Kelly.

Plot 
The film explores many social issues like drug dealing, the search for respect and power, the roles of mothers and fathers in low-income or minority based communities, and violence. Kevin 'Jedi' Barrows is the lead actor who is a 20-year-old male that ultimately learns through tragedy.

Cast  
 K.C. Collins as Kevin "Jeddi" Barrows
 Mark Taylor as Mike "Twist" Twistleton
 Genelle Williams as Monica
 Clé Bennett as "Money"
 Kristin Fairlie as Kelly
 Yanna McIntosh as Pat Barrows
 Shakura S'Aida as Karen Twistleton
 Shawn Singleton as Ashcroft
 Zainab Musa as Constance Barrows
 Quincy Nanatakyi as Sean
 Suzanne Coy as Marva
 Mpho Koaho as Paul "Countryman" Blackhall
 Whitney Turner as Eric "Eric D"
 Jazzmeyn Barnett as Asia

Critical reception 
A very real and authentic representation of the struggle that individuals and groups in low-income or minority based communities go through to get by on a day-to-day basis. Using local and Canadian actors, many viewers found a connection that made this film more enjoyable to watch. As mentioned in most reviews, Doomstown is a great teaching film that can be used for educational purposes in both a school/classroom setting and/or in homes. The storyline or plot was not overdone, and really "hit home" to the people of Toronto or individuals that were familiar with the city and its local news that contained the problems presented.

Awards 
Doomstown won three Gemini Awards in 2007 according to IMDb and World News/Variety.com:

2007 Gemini Award for Best Direction in a Dramatic Program or Mini-Series: Doomstown, Sudz Sutherland
2007 Gemini Award for Best Performance by an Actress in a Featured Supporting Role in a Dramatic Program or Mini-Series: Won by Yanna McIntosh for her role as Pat Barrows
2007 Gemini Award for Best TV Movie: Pierre Sarrazin, Suzette Couture, Susan Murdoch

References

External links
 Doomstown at IMDb

2006 films
2006 television films
Canadian drama television films
Films directed by Sudz Sutherland
English-language Canadian films
Gemini and Canadian Screen Award for Best Television Film or Miniseries winners
2000s Canadian films